Sir Andrew John Gregory Moylan (born 23 June 1953), is a British Court of Appeal of England and Wales judge.

See also

 List of High Court judges of England and Wales

References 

1953 births
Living people
Alumni of the University of Oxford
British King's Counsel
Family Division judges
Knights Bachelor
Lords Justices of Appeal
Members of the Privy Council of the United Kingdom